Lê Quang Đạo (8 August 1921 – 24 July 1999) was a Vietnamese politician who was a member of the Central Committee of the Communist Party of Vietnam from 1960 to 1991. Having served 28 years in the military, he was promoted to the rank of Major General in 1959 and Lieutenant General in 1974. He was Chairman of the National Assembly and also one of the Vice Chairmen of the State Council of Vietnam from 1987 to 1992.

As a native of Đình Bảng village in Từ Sơn District, in the Red River Delta province of Bắc Ninh, he was instrumental in the government's restoration of the Đô Temple as a national memorial.

References

1921 births
1999 deaths
Chairmen of the Standing Committee of the National Assembly (Vietnam)
Vice presidents of Vietnam
Members of the 4th Secretariat of the Communist Party of Vietnam
Members of the 5th Secretariat of the Communist Party of Vietnam
Alternates of the 3rd Central Committee of the Workers' Party of Vietnam
Members of the 4th Central Committee of the Communist Party of Vietnam
Members of the 5th Central Committee of the Communist Party of Vietnam
Members of the 6th Central Committee of the Communist Party of Vietnam
People from Bắc Ninh province